The Pembroke City Council is the governing body of the Corporation of the City of Pembroke, Ontario, Canada. It is composed of five councillors, one mayor and one deputy mayor.

Elections
Elections are held every four years, per the Ontario Municipal Elections Act. Councillors are elected by the electorate at large; that is, without geographic divisions. The mayor is also directly elected.

2006 elections
Results from 2006 municipal elections:

Mayor

Council

Budget
For the 2009 fiscal year, council approved a municipal budget of $29.3 million . As of 2009, the Corporation's debtload is $15.95 million.

References

External links
Official website

Municipal councils in Ontario
Pembroke, Ontario